Lloyd Hesketh Bamford-Hesketh (1788–1861) was the owner of the Gwrych Castle estate in the historic county of Denbighshire, Wales. He was the High Sheriff of Denbighshire in 1828.

The Lloyds of Gwrych resided at 'Plâs yn Gwrych' in a coastal strip between Abergele and Llanddulas. Over successive generations from the sixteenth century, the family created a gentry seat with formal gardens, estate buildings, a bathing house at Ty Crwn and extensive walled gardens.

Lloyd Hesketh Bamford Hesketh's parents (who both married in 1787) were Frances Lloyd of Gwrych and Robert Bamford-Hesketh of Bamford Hall & Upton Hall, his grandfather Robert (also of the same name), was the heir to the Bamford estate.

Gwrych Castle was built by Lloyd as a memorial to his mother and her ancestors much to his own designs. As a Fellow of the Society of Antiquaries, he took a keen interest in medieval architecture, art and archaeology. There is clear evidence that the castle was complete by the time he married Lady Emily Esther Ann Lygon (youngest daughter of the First Earl of Beauchamp) in 1825 as there were no references to the marriage in the heraldic glass at Gwrych Castle. 

At his death in 1861, the heir to Gwrych Castle and the estate was Lloyd's son Robert Bamford-Hesketh (1826-1894) who married Ellen Jones-Bateman in 1851.

References

1788 births
1861 deaths
People from Abergele
18th-century Welsh architects